Hluboká is a municipality and village in Chrudim District in the Pardubice Region of the Czech Republic. It has about 200 inhabitants.

Administrative parts
Villages and hamlets of Chlum, Dolany and Střítež are administrative parts of Hluboká.

References

External links

Villages in Chrudim District